Justin Paul is a professor of business administration at the University of Puerto Rico with a 3 year Visiting Professor assignment with Henley Business School, University of Reading, UK and editor-in chief of the International Journal of Consumer Studies. Previously, Paul served as a faculty member with Rollins College, the University of Washington and Nagoya University of Commerce and Business, Japan.

Career

Paul started his career as a bank officer in India. He left his bank job and did his PhD.  He was an assistant professor and department chair at Indian Institute of Management (IIM). Currently, he serves as an associate editor of European Management Journal and Journal of Strategic Marketing  and sits on the editorial board of several academic journals such as Journal of International Management.

He holds two titles- ‘Distinguished Scholar’ conferred by Indian Institute of Management (IIM), and ‘Distinguished Professor’ by Symbiosis Institute of Business Management, India. He is known as proponent of Masstige Theory/ Model and measure for brand management,
CPP Model for internationalization of the firms, 7-P Framework for international marketing and SCOPE framework for the success of small firms.

Paul is an author of eight books including Business Environment (4th edition), Export-Import Management (2nd edition), International Marketing (2nd edition), Services Marketing, Management of Banking and Financial Services (4th edition), International Business (6th edition), Economic Environment & Policies for Business, and Digital Transformation in Business and Society published by McGraw-Hill, Oxford University Press and Pearson, Cengage and Palgrave Macmillan respectively.

Previously, Paul served as a visiting professor with the University of Chicago, Vienna University of Economics and Business- Austria, Aarhus University-Denmark and visited over 60 countries for academic activities. Paul is also an author of 4 case studies published by Ivey Business School & Harvard Business School. The case studies are titled as: Louis Vuitton in Japan, Ferro Industries- Exporting Challenge and L’oserie: Turnaround Challenges.

Books

Selected publications
Paul, J., Parthasarathy, S., & Gupta, P. (2017). Exporting challenges of SMEs: A review and future research agenda. Journal of world business, 52(3), 327-342.

References

External links
 

Living people
Year of birth missing (living people)
University of Washington faculty
Rollins College faculty
University of Puerto Rico faculty